Maynard Ferguson Octet is an album by Canadian jazz trumpeter/trombonist Maynard Ferguson featuring tracks recorded in 1955 and released on the EmArcy label.

Reception
Allmusic awarded the album 4½ stars.

Track listing
All compositions by Bill Holman except as indicated
 "Finger Snappin'" - 3:55    
 "My New Flame  4:09    
 "Autumn Leaves" (Joseph Kosma, Jacques Prévert, Johnny Mercer) - 3:20    
 "Inter-Space" - 3:35    
 "20 Rue De Madrid" - 5:06    
 "Super-G" - 7:39    
 "What Was Her Name?" - 5:10    
 "Yeah" - 6:51  
Recorded at Capitol Studios in Los Angeles on April 25 (tracks 1-5) and April 27 (tracks 6-8), 1955

Personnel 
Maynard Ferguson - trumpet, valve trombone, bass trombone
Conte Candoli - trumpet
Milt Bernhart - trombone
Herb Geller - alto saxophone
Georgie Auld - tenor saxophone
Bob Gordon - baritone saxophone 
Ian Bernard - piano
Red Callender - bass  
Shelly Manne - drums
Bill Holman - arranger

References 

1955 albums
Maynard Ferguson albums
EmArcy Records albums